Woodie may refer to:

Woodie, a wooden roller coaster with running rails made of flattened steel strips mounted on a laminated wooden track
Woodie, the first Fender amplifier
Woodie, slang for a penile erection
Woodie (car body style), a type of car with a rear portion of the bodywork made of wood
Woodie Awards, a semi-annual awards show on mtvU
Woodie's DIY, an Irish DIY store chain operated by the Grafton Group
The Woodies, nickname for longtime Australian tennis doubles partners Todd Woodbridge and Mark Woodforde
Woody (name), a list which includes people with the given name Woodie

See also 
Wood (disambiguation)
Woodies (disambiguation)
Woody (disambiguation)
Wu Di (disambiguation)